Michael Darr Barnes (born September 3, 1943) is an American lawyer and politician who represented the eighth district of Maryland in the United States House of Representatives from 1979 to 1987.

Early life
Born in Washington, D.C. to John P. Barnes former general counsel to C&P Telephone Company, and Vernon S. Barnes. His grandfather John P. Barnes was a judge on the U.S. District Court for the Northern District of Illinois. Barnes moved to Chevy Chase in Montgomery County, Maryland at age 13.

Personal life
Barnes married Claudia Dillon Fangboner in 1970. He has two daughters, Dillon and Garrie.

Career

After serving in the Marine Corps (1967 to 1969), being discharged with the rank of corporal, Barnes attended George Washington University and obtained a Juris Doctor degree in 1972. Barnes served on the Maryland Public Service Commission. Barnes served as executive director of the 1976 Democratic party platform committee.  Barnes served in both private and government practice until his election to the House of Representatives as a Democrat in 1978.

Tenure in Congress 
During the first session of the 99th Congress, he was the chairman of the Western Hemisphere Subcommittee of the House Foreign Affairs Committee. As a member of Congress, Barnes was generally an outspoken critic of Ronald Reagan's Central America policy, although he did in 1983 call the United States invasion of Grenada "justified," after a personal trip to the island. In 1986, Barnes lost the Democratic nomination for U.S. Senator from Maryland to Barbara Mikulski and retired to private legal practice.

Later career 
Following his congressional service, Barnes was President of the Brady Center to Prevent Gun Violence, Chair of the Center for National Policy, Chair of the Governor's Commission on Growth in the Chesapeake Bay Region and a member of the Boards of Directors of the Metropolitan Washington Airports Authority, University of Maryland Foundation, Center for International Policy, Public Voice, and the Overseas Development Council. Prior to his service in Congress, Barnes was a Commissioner of the Maryland Public Service Commission and Vice Chairman of the Washington Metropolitan Area Transit Commission.

From 2000 through 2006, he served as president of the Brady Campaign to Prevent Gun Violence. Barnes was Senior Of Counsel in the Washington, D.C., law firm of Covington & Burling. He retired as senior counsel at Covington & Burling LLP in December 2010.

Barnes joined the Board of Directors of the Washington Metropolitan Area Transit Authority in April 2011 as Principal Director representing Montgomery County and the State of Maryland. He is a senior fellow at the Center for International Policy in Washington, DC. Barnes is also a member of the Inter-American Dialogue and the ReFormers Caucus of Issue One.

He was appointed to be a member of the Office of Congressional Ethics, a nonpartisan, independent committee charged with overseeing outside ethics complaints against members of Congress.

Education
Barnes attended the Landon School in Bethesda, Maryland. He graduated from Principia High School in St. Louis, Missouri in 1962. He earned his B.A. from the University of North Carolina at Chapel Hill in 1965, where he was a member of the Delta Upsilon fraternity. He attended the Graduate Institute of International Studies in Geneva, Switzerland from 1965 to 1966. He attained his J.D. from George Washington University in 1972.

Further reading
North, Oliver Under Fire: An American Story

References

External links

 Retrieved on 2008-02-25
Michael Barnes article at stennis.gov
 

1943 births
Living people
20th-century American lawyers
20th-century American politicians
George Washington University Law School alumni
Graduate Institute of International and Development Studies alumni
People from Bethesda, Maryland
People from Kensington, Maryland
Politicians from Washington, D.C.
University of North Carolina at Chapel Hill alumni
United States Marine Corps non-commissioned officers
Military personnel from Washington, D.C.
American gun control activists
Maryland lawyers
2008 United States presidential electors
Democratic Party members of the United States House of Representatives from Maryland
Members of the Inter-American Dialogue
Members of Congress who became lobbyists